Andrew Wilder may refer to: 

Andrew Wilder (American football) (born 1990), American football player
Andrew S. Wilder, American television writer and producer